Tampea is a genus of moths in the subfamily Arctiinae.

Species
 Tampea acanthocera (Hampson, 1905)
 Tampea accepta (Butler, 1877)
 Tampea hammatocera (Wileman & West, 1928)
 Tampea metaphaeola (Hampson, 1900)
 Tampea nodosa Holloway, 2001
 Tampea reversa Walker, 1862
 Tampea wollastoni Rothschild, 1916

References

Natural History Museum Lepidoptera generic names catalog

Lithosiini
Moth genera